Masumiyeh Rural District is a rural district (dehestan) in the Central District of Arak County, Markazi Province, Iran. At the 2006 census, its population (including Karchan, which subsequently was detached from the rural district and promoted to city status) was 11,453, in 3,212 families; excluding Karchan, the population (as of 2006) was 7,923, in 2,248 families. The rural district has 12 villages.

References 

Rural Districts of Markazi Province
Arak County